Benjamin Earl Blomdahl (born December 30, 1970) is former Major League Baseball pitcher. Blomdahl played for the Detroit Tigers in 1995. Blomdahl never won a game in the majors but did pick up one save. It came on September 27, 1995, during a game against the Boston Red Sox. Blomdahl recorded the final out of the game to hold down a 7-5 Tigers victory. Blomdahl made 14 appearances in the major leagues, all in relief.

References

External links

1970 births
American expatriate baseball players in Canada
Baseball players from California
Buffalo Bisons (minor league) players
Detroit Tigers players
Fayetteville Generals players
Lakeland Tigers players
Living people
London Tigers players
Major League Baseball pitchers
Niagara Falls Rapids players
Riverside City Tigers baseball players
Toledo Mud Hens players
Riverside Polytechnic High School alumni